Deportivo La Coruña Brasil Futebol Clube, commonly known as La Coruña, is a Brazilian football club based in Rio de Janeiro, Rio de Janeiro state.

History
The club was founded on November 15, 1994, being named after Spanish club Deportivo de La Coruña, by the club's lifelong president, Maria Geralda dos Santos, due to Bebeto's spell at the Spanish team.

Stadium

Deportivo La Coruña Brasil Futebol Clube play their home games at Estádio Eduardo Guinle, located in Nova Friburgo. The stadium has a maximum capacity of 6,550 people.

References

Association football clubs established in 1994
Football clubs in Rio de Janeiro (state)
1994 establishments in Brazil